is a Japanese anime television series and the third television series in the Digimon franchise, produced by Toei Animation. The series takes place in a new setting separate from the preceding series, Digimon Adventure and Digimon Adventure 02, where the characters utilize cards from the collectible card games. The series aired in Japan from April 2001 to March 2002.

The series was originally licensed in North America by Saban Entertainment, aired in the US from September 2001 to June 2002 as the third season of  Digimon: Digital Monsters. A Hong Kong manhua adaptation of the series, by Yuen Wong Yu, was serialized from April to October 2004.

Plot

Takato Matsuki, a fan of the Digimon card game, finds a Blue Card, which transforms his card reader into a D-Power Digivice. His original Digimon creation, Guilmon, materializes into real life when his D-Power scans his drawings. Takato meets Henry Wong and Rika Nonaka, two other children who are partnered with Terriermon and Renamon respectively, as well as Calumon and Impmon. As wild Digimon began roaming Shinjuku, the Tamers defeat them and defend the city. Using their D-Powers, the Tamers can Digi-modify through scanning cards or help them Digivolve. After each Digimon is defeated, their Digimon obtains their data. Meanwhile, Hypnos, an intelligence agency led by Mitsuo Yamaki, has been capturing the Digimon and sending them back to the Digital World.

The Tamers eventually began working with Hypnos when the Devas invade the Real World. Calumon is captured by the Devas, and the Tamers follow him to the Digital World to save him. When Impmon turns on and attacks the Tamers and murders Leomon, Jeri Kato falls into depression. After resolving conflicts with the Digimon Sovereigns, the Tamers learn that the Digimon are protecting themselves from humans and the Real World after the Digital World is invaded by the D-Reaper, a rogue clean-up program. As the Tamers return to the Real World, the D-Reaper kidnaps Jeri, manipulating and trapping her inside the body. When the D-Reaper begins to materialize in the Real World, the Tamers defeat it, using the program and saving Jeri. With both worlds restored, the children are forced to say goodbye to their Digimon partners, when they end up returning to the Digital World by the effects of the program. The series ends with Takato discovering the portal in the tunnel under his hiding place.

Production
After the success of Digimon Adventure 02, Hiroyuki Kakudo and staff did not know what to do now that the series was finished. The team was satisfied with the release of Digimon Tamers, as Kakudo believed the setting could have also been applied in the previous anime.  Chiaki J. Konaka was concerned that the portrayal of the Digimon as "kind-hearted creatures" in Digimon Adventure and Digimon Adventure 02 might affect the "monster-like spirit of Digimon." As a result, Konaka wanted to explore the primitive nature of Digimon, where they instinctively harm other creatures to become stronger and would learn morals from their partners. This aspect would be primarily explored through Guilmon.

Konaka was also worried about Digivolutions losing impact due to their repetitiveness. In order to solve this, the D-Power was designed as the new Digivice so that it could be used alongside cards and give the characters another "ace up sleeve." The writers wanted to limit the use of cards to one at a time. The main characters being more responsible of the evolutions and their adventures was another of Konaka's priorities as a message to children from modern society. For the last episodes of the series, Konaka believed the final enemy is the D-Reaper. While making the series, Konaka had conceptualized the idea of the Tamers combining with their Digimon to reach the highest level of evolution, Mega. Shinji Aramaki joined the design team in the CGI animation, which including the Bio-merge scenes.

Unlike the previous series, Konaka did not introduce the idea of Digimon being reborn after death, as he believed death should be portrayed realistically in a show for children, especially since the main characters were risking their lives. As a result, the staff decided to portray death as a shocking event by using Leomon like in Digimon Adventure, even though Konaka had doubts about it. While the series was presented as dark, Terriermon and Calumon balanced out the tone of the series.

According to Chiaki Konaka, the story-line of Digimon Tamers was largely influenced by one of the original scripts prepared for Gamera: Guardian of the Universe by Chiaki and Kazuya Konaka before the script written by Kazunori Itō, and the ideas by Konaka brothers were later adopted for Digimon Tamers and Gamera the Brave.

Character design
The characters were designed by Katsuyoshi Nakatsuru and was based on the concept of "a normal elementary school student has a great adventure over the span of a year." Producer Hiromi Seki had wanted the three main characters to be of mixed genders and consist of an immigrant or someone not raised in Japan. Rika was designed with a "strong" image and character in an attempt to boost sales for products based on female characters, which traditionally did not perform well in the market. Henry became the basis of the proposed non-Japanese or emigrant character, and Konaka decided to make him half-Chinese and half-Japanese based on the statistics of non-Japanese students in elementary schools. Originally, the main cast from Digimon Adventure and Digimon Adventure 02 was set to appear as mentors. The idea was scrapped and only Ryo Akiyama from the WonderSwan games was used.

Sequel

In 2021, Konaka had posted on his blog that he originally had plans to create Digimon Tamers 2020, which would have been the continuation of an audio drama that was released with the 2018 limited edition Blu-ray box set of Digimon Tamers. However, Toei Animation had rejected the pitch; Konaka claimed it was due to casting problems, particularly in regards to having some voice actors reprise their roles or play older versions of their characters convincingly.

Media

Anime series 

The series aired 51 episodes on Fuji TV in Japan from April 1, 2001 to March 31, 2002. The opening theme is "The Biggest Dreamer" by Kōji Wada, which peaked at #59 on the Oricon Weekly Singles Chart. The ending themes are performed by AiM, the first half of the show being "My Tomorrow" and the second half being . "My Tomorrow" peaked at #70 on the Oricon Weekly Singles Chart, while "Days (Aijō to Nichijō)" charted at #68. Insert songs featured in the show include "Slash" by Michihiko Ohta as the Digi-modify theme, "Evo" by Wild Child Bound as the Digivolution and Matrix Digivolution themes, and "One Vision" by Takayoshi Tanimoto as the Biomerge Digivolution theme.

An edited English-language version was produced by distributor Saban Entertainment and aired on Fox Kids in the United States from September 1, 2001 to June 8, 2002 as the third season of Digimon: Digital Monsters. Saban's version received various changes to character names, music and sound effects, as well as edits pertaining to violence and cultural references. Even though the setting of the country is still in Japan and the cards keep their original Japanese appearances and text in the English dub. The show also began airing on ABC Family in 2002, after Disney had acquired the rights from Saban Entertainment, which later also included a package deal with Digimon Frontier. The show was released on Hulu with English subtitles in January 2011. New Video Group release the dubbed version as a DVD boxset in North America on June 11, 2013. Manga Entertainment released the series in the United Kingdom in 2018.

The series was added to the Netflix Instant Streaming service on August 3, 2013 in separate English dubbed and Japanese subtitled versions. The series was removed on August 1, 2015, after nearly two years on Netflix when Crunchyroll acquired streaming rights to the English dubbed versions and Funimation acquired rights to the English subtitled versions, the English dubbed version of Tamers returned to Netflix while the English subtitled version of Tamers are now exclusive to Funimation.

Films

 was released on July 14, 2001 as part of Toei Animation Summer 2001 Animation Fair. The film was featured along with Mōtto! Ojamajo Doremi: The Movie: Kaeru Seki no Himitsu and Kinnikuman: Second Generations. The film takes place during the Tamers' summer vacation, where Mephistomon sends Digimon to invade the Real World through a virus called the "V-Pet." The film's ending theme song is "Moving On!" by AiM, which peaked at #95 on the Oricon Weekly Singles Chart. An insert song in the film, was performed by Sammy and released as a single on September 29, 2001. The film's original soundtrack was released on December 5, 2001.

 was released on March 2, 2002 as part of Toei Animation Spring 2002 Animation Fair. The film was double-billed with One Piece: Chopper's Kingdom on the Island of Strange Animals. The film grossed ¥200 billion. The film's story is centered on the Tamers battling Locomon, who has been infected by Parasimon and led into the Real World.

CD dramas 
Two CD dramas written by Chiaki J. Konaka were released. The voice cast from the series reprised their roles.

 was released on April 23, 2003 and follows the lives of each Tamer after the events of Digimon Tamers.

 was released on April 3, 2018 as a bonus with the first-press edition of the Digimon Tamers Blu-ray disc set.

Short story 
Digimon Tamers 1984, written by Chiaki J. Konaka and illustrated by Kenji Watanabe, was published on July 5, 2002 in Volume 5 of SF Japan, a Japanese science fiction magazine. The story focuses on the creation of the original Digimon program by the Monster Makers at Palo Alto University and dealt largely with the philosophical and technological issues surrounding the creation of artificial intelligence. In 2018, Konaka uploaded an updated version of the story onto his website.

Reception
Due to its differences from the first two Digimon series, Tamers received mixed reviews when it first aired in the United States (September 1, 2001). Tim Jones of THEM Anime writes, "Although Digimon Tamers has its faults (slow character development, a sudden change in new characters from the last series, and a less-than-exciting first half), the more you watch it, and the further you get into it, the more you'll enjoy it." In comparison to the first two series, Tamers also displayed darker undertones in its plot. According to English-language dub voice actor Dave Wittenberg, the new series possessed "an element of seriousness" that was not present in the first two series. Additionally, some parts would be better understood by older viewers due to the introduction of more difficult concepts. Regarding this, Konaka believes that Calumon and Terriermon were able to tone down the grim and serious atmosphere of the occasionally tough scenes throughout the series.

The airing of the series coincided with the September 11 attacks, and in at least one case, the events have been analyzed within the context of the series. Margaret Schwartz of PopMatters writes, "As NPR and other […] media began to debate the September 11 images, I began to see just how important it was to consider how we as a culture define and experience 'reality' […] Some argue that the shocking video footage […] is a necessary experience of the catastrophe—even a condition of it." She points out the metafictional story of Tamers where "bits of forgotten computer data have fused to become a separate world inhabited by live creatures". In acknowledging the line drawn between good and evil in the series, Schwartz writes, "The evil here consists in refusing to see that Digimon are 'real', real creatures, and that destroying any one of them is in fact murder." Through the existence of intangible communication networks as a "product of human ingenuity", she concludes that "those of us in the 'real' world have become so good at playing creator, at making 'things' appear much like 'real' creatures, that we tend to confuse the two."

Controversy

DigiFes 2021, an official Digimon event taking place annually on August 1, held a live reading featuring the original voice cast of an original audio drama that Konaka had written for Digimon Tamers''' 20th anniversary. The script featured the Tamers fighting a villainous entity called "political correctness", which used an attack called "cancel culture." Prior to this, Konaka had been keeping a retrospective blog for rewatching Digimon Tamers'' and had blogged his opinions about conspiracy theories around 9/11 and COVID-19. The audio drama was met with international backlash. Konaka released an apology on his blog and clarified that he did not associate with any political ideology.

Notes

References

External links
 Toei Animation official site (Japanese)
 Digimon Tamers Resources

2001 anime television series debuts
Adventure anime and manga
Animated television series about children
Card games in anime and manga
Tamers
Fantasy anime and manga
Fuji TV original programming
Japanese children's animated adventure television series
Metafictional television series
Television series about parallel universes
Television series by Saban Entertainment
Television series set in 2001
Toei Animation television